The Rural City of Swan Hill is a local government area in Victoria, Australia, located in the north-western part of the state. It includes the towns of Swan Hill, Lake Boga, Manangatang, Nyah, Nyah West, Piangil, Robinvale, Ultima and Woorinen South. It was formed in 1995 from the amalgamation of the City of Swan Hill, Shire of Swan Hill and part of the Shire of Kerang.

The Rural City is governed and administered by the Swan Hill Rural City Council; its seat of local government and administrative centre is located at the council headquarters in Swan Hill, it also has a service centre located in Robinvale. The Rural City is named after the main urban settlement lying in the south-east of the LGA, that is Swan Hill, which is also the LGA's most populous urban centre with a population of 10,431.

Council

Current composition 
The council is composed of four wards and seven councillors, with four councillors elected to represent the Central Ward and one councillor per remaining ward elected to represent each of the other wards.

Administration and governance 
The council meets in the council chambers at the council headquarters in the Swan Hill Municipal Offices, which is also the location of the council's administrative activities. It also provides customer services at both its administrative centre in Swan Hill, and its service centre in Robinvale.

Townships and localities
The 2021 census, the rural city had a population of 21,403 up from 20,584 in the 2016 census

^ - Territory divided with another LGA
* - Not noted in 2016 Census
# - Not noted in 2021 Census

Sister cities 
 Yamagata, Yamagata, Japan

See also 
 List of places on the Victorian Heritage Register in the Rural City of Swan Hill

References

External links 

Swan Hill Rural City Council official website
Metlink local public transport map
Link to Land Victoria interactive maps

Local government areas of Victoria (Australia)
Loddon Mallee (region)